Sde Moshe (lit. Moshe Field) is a moshav in south-central Israel. Located in Hevel Lakhish, about three kilometres east of Kiryat Gat, it falls under the jurisdiction of Lakhish Regional Council.

History
Sde Moshe was founded in 1956 as part of a movement from the city to the village, on land of the depopulated   Palestinian   village Iraq al-Manshiyya.

It is named after Baron Maurice de Hirsch, whose Hebrew name was Moshe, and who was one of the founders of the Jewish Colonization Association. It was originally named "Sde Yeshayahu."

References

Moshavim
Populated places established in 1956
Populated places in Southern District (Israel)
1956 establishments in Israel